Martin Emmett Toppino (July 1, 1909 – September 8, 1971) was an American athlete, winner of a gold medal in the 4 × 100 m relay at the 1932 Summer Olympics.

At the Los Angeles Olympics, Emmett Toppino from New Orleans ran the second leg in the American 4 × 100 m relay team, which won the gold medal with a new world record of 40.0.

He was a member of the track and field team for the Loyola Wolf Pack and was a member of the Beggars Fraternity at Loyola University New Orleans.

Emmett Toppino died in New Orleans in 1971, aged 62.

References

External links

1909 births
1971 deaths
American male sprinters
Athletes (track and field) at the 1932 Summer Olympics
Olympic gold medalists for the United States in track and field
Medalists at the 1932 Summer Olympics
Track and field athletes from New Orleans
USA Indoor Track and Field Championships winners